Henry House or Henry's House may refer to:

Places

Canada
Henry House (Halifax, Nova Scotia), a National Historic Site of Canada
Henry's House, Alberta, a former minor trading post

United States
Albert G. Henry Jr. House, Guntersville, Alabama, listed on the NRHP in Marshall County, Alabama, also known as Henry House
Henry–Jordan House, Guntersville, Alabama, listed on the NRHP in Marshall County, Alabama, also known as Henry House
Henry House (Marion, Alabama), NRHP-listed
Oakland/Henry House Hopkinsville, Kentucky, listed on the NRHP in Christian County, Kentucky, also known as Henry House
Joseph Henry House, Princeton, New Jersey, NRHP-listed, also known as Henry House
Hugh Henry House, Henryetta, Oklahoma, listed on the NRHP in Okmulgee County, Oklahoma, also known as Henry House
Henry House (Binfield, Tennessee), listed on the National Register of Historic Places in Blount County, Tennessee
Henry House (Bennington, Vermont), listed on the NRHP as "William Henry House"
Henry House (Suamico, Wisconsin), listed on the NRHP in Brown County, Wisconsin

People
Henry Alonzo House (1840–1930), inventor
Harry House (1919–2006), Australian rules footballer

Other 

 Henry's House (video game), a 1984 video game
 Henry's House (PR firm), a London-based creative public relations agency

See also
Henry Howse (1841–1914), English surgeon